The Bielsko-Biala School of Finance and Law (Wyższa Szkoła Finansów i Prawa w Bielsku-Białej) is a school in Bielsko-Biała, Poland. It was founded in 1995 and gained its current name in 2011. Currently, the school offers courses in two departments and four different majors are: Finance, Information Technology, Law, and Internal Security.

References

External links
 

Educational institutions established in 1995
Bielsko-Biała
1995 establishments in Poland